Umarpur is a Union Parishad under Osmani Nagar Upazila of Sylhet District in the division of Sylhet, Bangladesh. It has a total area of 12 square kilometres and a population of 58,679.

History 
Following the Conquest of Sylhet in 1303, one of Shah Jalal's disciples, Shah Jalaluddin, migrated to modern-day Umarpur Union. Jalaluddin settled in Khujgipur where he cured the disabled daughter of a local Brahmin and later married her. His tomb is present in a mazar (mausoleum) in Khujgipur and his descendants continue to inhabit the village. In addition to Jalaluddin, another Sufi pir by the name of Syed Kamaluddin Ahmad settled in the village of Bara Isabpur. He is also known as Shah Damri or Damri Pir because he had left his hometown of Patna with only one damri. Shah Damri married the daughter of Shaykh Kalu, a disciple of Shah Jalal that settled in Pirergaon, Jagannathpur. He also had two brothers, Syed Shah Subhanuddin and Syed Shah Badr Alam. Subhanuddin is buried in Isabpur where his descendants live whilst Badr Alam remained in Pirergaon. They are also related to Syed Shah Husayn Alam, author of Bhedsar. Also, Umarpur Union was the home of Shah Mullah Mubarak after whom the village of Mollapara is named after. His mazar is also situated in Mollapara. The mazar of Shaykh Yunus Shah can be found in eastern Khadimpur.

During the Bangladesh Liberation War of 1971, five prominent freedom fighters which fought were: Muhammad Moyna Miah, Muhammad Afsar Miah, Muhammad Shonafor Ali, Muhammad Rafiq Ali and Muhammad Mufassil Ali.

Umarpur Union council building was established in 2007–2008.

Demography 
Umarpur has a population of 21,026. 9,920 are men and 11,106 are women.

Administration 

Ward 1: Lama Hijolshah, Hizolshah, Umarpur, Umarpur Bazaar, Shahzhanpur, Bade Khujgipur, Mathiya Khara, Adityapur, Kamalpur, Shivpur
Ward 2: Niz Mandaruka, Tajpur, East Mandaruka, Paragalpur, Majidpur
Ward 3: Dilalpur, Itachhoki, Chouddo Kiyar, Kaliya, Ekanidha, Khadimpur
Ward 4: Saidpur, Madhabpur, Majlispur
Ward 5: Kotalpur, Habshpur, Chebar Para, Bongram, Mullah Para, Tahirpur
Ward 6: Abdullahpur, Marupara, Poshchimgaon, Maijgaon, Bhoraut, Purbogaon, Rangbaran, Hamtonpur 
Ward 7: Lama Ishobpur, Khujgipur
Ward 8: Boro Ishobpur
Ward 9: Matihani, Housepur

Chairmen

Economy and tourism 
Umarpur has a significant number of British immigrants contributing to its economy. It has two haat bazaars and they are Umarpur Bazaar and Khadimpur New Market Bazar. It has three canals; Khadimpur Meledari Canal, Habshpur-Kotalpur Kashtgang Canal and Sikandarpur Canal. The mazars of Shah Jalaluddin (Khujgipur) and Shah Damri (Boro Ishobpur) are popular tourist sites.

Education 
There are eight madrasas namely; Kotalpur Darul Qiraat Hafizia Madrasa, Umarpur Bazar Anwarul Uloom Title Madrasa, Madinatul Uloom Women's Madrasa, Khadimpur Katal Khair Hafizia Dakhil Madrasa, Osmani Nagar Islamic Academy, Khadimpur Women's Qaumi Madrasa, Lama Ishobpur Ahmadiya Hafizia Madrasa and Shah Sikandar Hafizia Dakhil Madrasa.

Facilities 
The Union contains 53 mosques:
Syed Mandaruk Jame Masjid, Syed Mandaruka Kazirbazar Jame Masjid
Nij Mandaruka Jame Masjid, Nij Mandaruka New Jame Masjid, East Mandaruka Jame Masjid, East Mandaruka New Jame Masjid
Kotalpur East Jame Masjid, Kotalpur West Jame Masjid
Habshpur Jame Masjid
Mullah Para Jame Masjid
Tahirpur Jame Masjid
Umarpur Jame Masjid, Bayt an-Najat Jame Masjid, Umarpur Bazar Jame Masjid, Anwarul Uloom Masjid
Kamalpur Jame Masjid
Hijolshah Jame Masjid
Shibpur Jame Masjid
Shahzhanpur Jame Masjid
Matiya Kara Jame Masjid
Khadimpur West Jame Masjid, Khadimpur East Jame Masjid, Khadimpur North Jame Masjid, New Market Jame Masjid
Madhavpur Jame Masjid
Mirza Shahidpur Jame Masjid, North Shahidpur Jame Masjid
Noagaon Jame Masjid
Majlispur Jame Masjid, Khamsopa Jame Masjid
Lama Ishobpur Jame Masjid, Bayt as-Salam North Boro Ishobpur Jame Masjid, Bayt an-Nur East Boro Ishobpur Jame Masjid, Central Boro Ishobpur Jame Masjid, South Boro Ishobpur Jame Masjid
Khuzgipur Man Ullah High School Jame Masjid, Khuzgipur Jame Masjid
Paragalpur Majidpur Jame Masjid
East Matihani Jame Masjid, South Matihani Jame Masjid, West Matihani Jame Masjid
Housepur Jame Masjid
Poshchimgaon Jame Masjid, Poshchimgaon Eidgah Jame Masjid
West Bagicha Jame Masjid
Maijgaon Jame Masjid
Rongboron Jame Masjid, East Rangboron Jame Masjid
Purbagaon Jame Masjid
Hashmatpur Jame Masjid
East Abdullahpur Jame Masjid, West Abdullahpur Jame Masjid
Syed Kamaluddin Shah Damri Masjid

References

Unions of Osmani Nagar Upazila